Mother Eliswa Vakayil (Eliswa of the Blessed Virgin Mary in religion) is the foundress of the first indigenous Carmelite congregation for women in India. She was the first religious sister from Kerala, the southern most state of India; she established the first convent school, boarding house and orphanage for girls in Kerala.

Early life 
She was born as the first of eight children of Thomman and Thanda, in the noble family of Vyppissery in the Cruz Milagres parish of Ochanthuruth. From her childhood itself Eliswa showed a keen interest in prayer and sacrifices. Her devotion to Jesus in the Eucharist and the Blessed Virgin Mary was astounding. Little Eliswa was exceptionally compassionate to the poor and the under privileged.

According to her parents' wishes, Eliswa married Vatharu Vakayil in 1847. A girl child was born to them on April 21, 1850, and she was named Anna. After one and a half years since Anna's birth, Vatharu suddenly fell ill and died. Even though Eliswa was suggested for a second marriage, she opted for a life of silent prayer and services.  Her frequent visits to the Blessed Sacrament at her parish church in Koonammavu nourished her soul and she surrendered herself wholly to the works of the Holy Spirit.

Foundress of TOCD 
Led by the Holy Spirit, Eliswa spent 14 years in silent prayer and meditation in a shed near her house, constructed by her family members as per her request. Thresia, her youngest sister and Anna, Eliswa's daughter herself, attracted to the lifestyle of prayer followed by Eliswa, joined her. Eliswa, with the assistance of her Confessor and spiritual director Fr. Leopold O.C.D, constructed a convent made of bamboo-mats(Panambu madam) and thus she started the first religious congregation for women in Kerala - Third Order of the Discalced Carmelite Congregation(TOCD) on 12 February 1866, rooted in the Carmelite spirituality.

Archbishop Bernardine Baccinelli, the then Vicar Apostolic of Verapoly, officially declared Eliswa, Anna and Thresia, as the foundation stones of the TOCD congregation by issuing the "Documentum Erectionis". Eliswa accepted women from the Syrian rite also, into her congregation. When the first woman from the Syro Malabar rite was requested to be admitted to the convent, Eliswa said: "We are poor and beggars, we are happy to accept you as one of our own sisters and share whatever God provides us with".

Bifurcation of the Congregation 
The Sacred Congregation of Propaganda Fide decided to change the jurisdiction over St Teresa's Convent at Koonammavu from the Archdiocese of Verapoly to the Vicariate of Thrissur on 24 March 1890. All the sisters belonging to the Latin rite, including Eliswa, the Foundress of the congregation, had to leave the convent  on 17 September 1890. They took shelter in St. Teresa's Convent at Ernakulam, founded by Mother Teresa of St. Rose of Lima (now Servant of God), for some days after which they were brought back to Varappuzha by the Archbishop of Verapoly. At present, the two branches of the TOCD Congregation serve as two independent religious congregations: The Congregation of Teresian Carmelites (CTC) and the Congregation of the Mother of Carmel (CMC).

Death and recognition of holiness 

Eliswa lived an exemplary life of prayer and selfless service to the poor and the abandoned. As a pioneer in providing education for girls in Kerala, Eliswa made sure that they were taught values of life along with subjects of science, mathematics, arts and  music as well as cooking, tailoring and handicrafts. She practiced a life of virtues and gratitude and nothing could change it even if  what she received was pain and injustice from others.

"God alone suffices" - this was her motto and her whole life was a reflection of this. Eliswa breathed her last on July 18, 1913, and was buried in a special place in front of the Basilica of Our lady of Mount Carmel & St Joseph. Her mortal remains were later transferred to the tomb chapel called Smruthi Mandhiram at St. Joseph's Convent of CTC at Varappuzha. Many pilgrims and the faithful visit her tomb to seek her intercession and obtain favours.

She was declared a Servant of God on 30 May 2008, by Archbishop Daniel Acharuparambil of Verapoly archdiocese. The diocesan inquiry was closed on 7 April 2017.

References 

1831 births
1913 deaths
Saints
Catholic saints
Founders of Catholic religious communities